The 50th New Brunswick Legislative Assembly was created following a general election in 1982. It was dissolved on August 29, 1987.

Leadership

James Tucker was chosen as speaker in 1983. Charles Gallagher became speaker in 1985 after Tucker was named to a cabinet post.

Premier Richard Hatfield led the government. The Progressive Conservative Party was the ruling party.

List of Members 

Notes:

See also
1982 New Brunswick general election
Legislative Assembly of New Brunswick

References 
 Canadian Parliamentary Guide, 1987, PG Normandin

Terms of the New Brunswick Legislature
1982 establishments in New Brunswick
1987 disestablishments in New Brunswick
20th century in New Brunswick